The 1959 Critérium du Dauphiné Libéré was the 13th edition of the Critérium du Dauphiné Libéré cycle race and was held from 1 June to 7 June 1959. The race started and finished in Grenoble. The race was won by Henry Anglade.

General classification

References

1959
1959 in French sport
1959 in road cycling
June 1959 sports events in Europe
1959 Super Prestige Pernod